Wrong Turn 6: Last Resort (stylized as Wrong Turn VI in the opening credits) is a 2014 American slasher film directed by Valeri Milev. It serves as a reboot and the sixth installment in the Wrong Turn film series.

The film was released on DVD and digitally on October 21, 2014. The film grossed $1 million in home sales. It was followed by another reboot, titled simply Wrong Turn (2021).

Plot
The Hillicker brothers Three Finger, Saw Tooth, and One Eye murder a pair of bikers, Daria and Nick, at a bike trail in West Virginia. The brothers are under the care of their demented relatives Jackson and Sally, the caretakers of the local hotel resort Hobbs Springs. Danny attends the resort for a family inheritance along with his girlfriend Toni, her brother Rod and their friends; Vic, Charlie, Bryan, and his girlfriend Jillian. Upon arrival, he is welcomed by Sally and Jackson, his cousins, but unbeknownst to his friends, the cannibals and Jackson murdered elderly hotel guest Agnes Fields in the hallway.

Bryan and Jillian, who are shopping for groceries the next day, are informed by a concerned Sheriff Doucette of the disappearances of the townsfolk including the hotel guests and Agnes. As he drives away, Doucette runs into a roadblock where he is killed by Three Finger. Alarmed by Bryan and Jillian's news of the townsfolk's fate, Danny's friends became suspicious to the nature of his cousins and his interest of staying with his family causing his relationship with the others to deteriorate. Toni sends Vic to find Danny who has gone hunting with Jackson out in the woods. Vic sees Saw Tooth devouring a deer that was killed by Danny during the hunt. When Danny plans on renovating the hotel to re-open next year, his friends reluctantly agree to stay. Jillian and Bryan, however, plan to leave the town and steal items from the hotel for money. While doing so, they discover a hidden door to a basement that leads to an underground bathhouse where Jillian gets horny and seduces Bryan into having sex with her. Right after Bryan makes Jillian climax midway through, the cannibals abruptly attack the couple. Bryan is hit in the head, giving him a crippling brain injury and then Jillian is brutally dismembered without Bryan to protect her, but Sally stops them from killing Bryan. She then drags him to her bedroom and rapes him. Next, she asphyxiates him with her pillow under Jackson's orders.

Now turning against his friends during a heated argument with Toni, Danny is introduced by Jackson and Sally to his long-lost cannibalistic relatives at the clearing. They explain to Danny, who is a Hillicker, of their origins. Vic follows them and overhears their conversation. He is then captured by the Hillickers who cut his throat and tear his innards out for the whole clan to eat for the ceremony. As the rest of the group begin to leave the next morning, Toni, Rod and Charlie discover Jackson cooking meals in the kitchen with dismembered corpses of the victims, including Bryan and Jillian. Horrified, they attempt to escape only to run into the cannibals who kill both Charlie and Rod. Toni arms herself with a rifle from the armory and enters the bathhouse to confront Sally about manipulating Danny against his friends. As they fight, Toni disfigures Sally and shoots off her leg with the rifle. Enraged, Jackson orders Danny to kill Toni but he lets her escape. Jackson pursues her until Toni retaliates by stabbing him in the head with the door keys, killing him. Toni leaves as the cannibals begin another killing spree.

One year after the reopening of the resort renamed as Hillicker Springs, Danny becomes the new manager and continues the sordid family tradition by having sex with Sally at the bathhouse as the other Hillickers watch.

Cast

 Anthony Ilott as Daniel 'Danny' Roth
 Aqueela Zoll as Toni
 Chris Jarvis as Jackson Hilliker
 Sadie Katz as Sally Hilliker
 Rollo Skinner as Vic
 Billy Ashworth as Rod
 Harry Belcher as Charlie
 Joe Gaminara as Bryan
 Roxanne Pallett as Jillian
 Radoslav Parvanov as Three Finger
 Danko Jordanov as Saw Tooth
 Asen Asenov as One Eye
 Kicker Robinson as Sheriff Doucette
 Talitha Luke-Eardley as Daria
 Luke Cousins as Nick Jacobs
 Josie Kidd as Agnes Fields
 Venetka Georgieva as Overweight Woman

Production
Director Declan O'Brien was replaced by film director Valeri Milev for the sixth installment in the Wrong Turn franchise. Which originally served as a sequel to Wrong Turn 5: Bloodlines (2012) to complete the prequel trilogy, but was scrapped. Shooting for the sixth film was reported to have commenced in March 2014 in Bulgaria.

Release
Fox Home Entertainment released it on home video on October 21, 2014. It grossed over $1 million in combined DVD and Blu-ray sales in North America.

Reception
28 Days Later Analysis reported on it being ten years "since actress Eliza Dushku played Jessie, a woman chased by a gang of cannibal hillbillies. A ten year run with five sequels makes the Wrong Turn film series one of the longest running horror franchises in recent history".  Joel Harley of Starburst rated it 7/10 stars and wrote, "If anything, this is one of the best entries yet."  Steve Barton of Dread Central rated it 1.5/5 stars and called it "all crap with a few good moments", though he praised Sadie Katz's acting.

Court case
In October 2014, a court case was filed in Ireland over the unauthorized use of a photo of a woman who went missing in County Wexford. The judge declined to issue a temporary injunction, but the case came back to court in early November 2014. As a result of the lawsuit, distributor 20th Century Fox recalled all DVD and Blu-ray releases of the film with no plan to repress or re-release and have also pulled all online streaming sources. The movie was eventually re-released with the photo in question blurred out.

References

External links
 
 

2014 films
2014 direct-to-video films
2014 horror films
2014 psychological thriller films
2010s slasher films
20th Century Fox direct-to-video films
Regency Enterprises films
Constantin Film films
Summit Entertainment films
American horror thriller films
American slasher films
Films about cults
Films shot in Bulgaria
Films set in 2013
Films set in hotels
Films set in West Virginia
Films about cannibalism
Reboot films
6
Direct-to-video horror films
2010s English-language films
2010s American films